Hong Sung-chil (Hangul: 홍숭칠) is a South Korean archer who won the 1999 World Championships in Riom, France.

References

South Korean male archers
Living people
Year of birth missing (living people)
World Archery Championships medalists
Universiade medalists in archery
Universiade silver medalists for South Korea
Medalists at the 2005 Summer Universiade
20th-century South Korean people